Strawberry Hill is a historic plantation house located near Enfield, Halifax County, North Carolina. It was built in 1792, and is a two-story, three bay, vernacular frame dwelling with 19th century rear additions. It has double-shouldered brick exterior end chimneys and a gable roof.

It was listed on the National Register of Historic Places in 1980.

References

Plantation houses in North Carolina
Houses on the National Register of Historic Places in North Carolina
Houses completed in 1792
Houses in Halifax County, North Carolina
National Register of Historic Places in Halifax County, North Carolina